Rosie is a feminine given name of English origin.  It is a diminutive form of the English language given name Rose, which is of Latin origin. Similar diminutives in other languages include:  becoming  in Spanish, and  becoming  in Slavic languages. Rosie is a nickname for variations of "Rose" such as "Rosalie", "Rosemary", "Roseanne", "Rosalyn", “Rosanna”, and more.

Historically, Rosie has been a reasonably popular given name for infants in England and Wales during the early 21st century, as it was in Victorian times. It continues to be popular in Scotland, as well.  However, it has been rare as a given name for newborns in the United States since the 1980s.
Rosaleen is also an Irish name, Rós Ailínn, meaning beautiful rose.

People

Acting and comedy
 Rosie Bentham (born 2001), British actress
 Rosie Cavaliero (born 1968), British actress
 Rosie Fleeshman (born 1992), British actress
 Rosie Jones (comedian) (born 1990), British comedian and actress
 Rosie Malek-Yonan (born 1965), Assyrian actress, artist, director, author and activist
 Rosie Marcel (born 1977), English actress
 Rosie O'Donnell (born 1962), American comedian and talk show hostess
 Rosie Perez (born 1964), American actress
 Rosie Tenison (born 1968), American actress and model
 Rosie Tran (born 1984), American actress, writer, and stand-up comedian
 Rosie Wilby (born 1970), British comedian

Musicians
 Rosie Flores (born 1950), American musician
 Rosie Gaines, American vocalist, musician, singer-songwriter, and producer
 Rosie Ledet (born 1971), American, Creole Zydeco accordion player and singer
 Rosie Martin (born 1963), Canadian musician
 Rosie Munter (born 1987), Swedish, member pop group Play
 Rosie Nix-Adams (1958–2003), American singer-songwriter
 Rosie Ribbons (born 1983), Australian singer
 Rosie Smith (born 1984), English musician
 Rosie Thomas (singer-songwriter), American singer and songwriter

Literature
 Rosie Boycott (born 1951), British journalist
 Rosie Scott (1948-2017), New Zealand author
 Rosie Stephenson-Goodknight (born 1953), American Wikipedia editor
 Rosie Thomas (writer) (born 1948), author
 R. G. Waldeck (1898–1982), American author

Politics
 Rosie Cooper (born 1950), British politician
 Rosie Douglas (1941–2000), Dominican politician
 Rosie Kane (born 1963), Scottish politician
 Rosie Méndez (born 1963), American politician
 Rosie Winterton (born 1958), British politician

Sports
 Rosie Bonds (born 1944), American hurdler
 Rosie Grant (born 1908-1974), American football player
 Rosie Jones (golfer) (born 1959), American professional golfer
 Rosie Manning (born 1950), American football player
 Rosie Napravnik (born 1988) American jockey
 Rosie Ruiz (born 1953), Cuban-American who briefly "won" the Boston Marathon by cheating
 Rosie Swale-Pope (born 1946), British charity fundraiser

Other fields
 Rosie Barnes (born 1946), British charity organiser and former politician
 Rosie Beaton, Australian radio announcer
 Rosie Boote (born 1878-1958), Irish chorus girl
 Rosie Huntington-Whiteley (born 1987), British supermodel
 Rosie Stancer (born 1960), English polar explorer

Fictional characters
 Rosie Banks, in the Channel 4 soap opera, Brookside, played by actress Susan Twist
 "Rosie", aka Rosetta Cammeniti, in the Australian soap opera Neighbours
 Rosie Colton, in the BBC soap opera Doctors, played by Janice Connolly
 Rosie Fox, in the ITV drama The Bill, played by actress Caroline Catz
 Rosie Grape, from the Christian children's direct-to-video series VeggieTales
 Rosie Hoyland, in the Australian soap opera Neighbours, played by actress Maggie Millar
 Rosie Miller, in the BBC soap opera EastEnders
 Rosie M. Banks, in Jeeves and Drones Club stories
 Rosie Mole, in Adrian Mole novels
 Rosie Webster, in the British TV soap opera Coronation Street
 Rosie the Riveter, American propaganda campaign to reduce labor shortages during the Second World War
 Rosie the Rocketeer, an anthropomorphic test dummy used by Boeing for Starliner test spaceflights
 Rosie the Robot Maid, in the animated TV show The Jetsons
 Rosie the Waitress, in commercials for Bounty paper towels, played by actress Nancy Walker
 Rodeo Rosie, on the American children's TV show Sesame Street
 Rosie (Big Daddy), a type of enemy in the popular 2007 video game BioShock and its sequel BioShock 2
 Rosie, a tank engine in the TV show Thomas and Friends
 Rosie, in the Canadian children's TV show Caillou
 Rosie, a baby girl in the animated film A Troll in Central Park
 Rosie, the roundabout in the children's TV show Playdays
 Rosie, a rag doll who was one of the titular characters in the British children's TV show Rosie & Jim
 Rosie, a black widow spider in the 1998 animated film A Bug's Life
 Rosie, a cat in the video game series Animal Crossing
 Rosie, the main character in the CBeebies show Everything's Rosie

References

English feminine given names
Given names
Feminine given names
English given names
Given names derived from plants or flowers